Events from the year 1825 in Sweden

Incumbents
 Monarch – Charles XIV John

Events
 3 February - Swedish Prison and Probation Service is founded. 
 24 November - The Makalös fire.
 - A motion in parliament suggest the abolition of the legal minority of adult unmarried women, but the reform is not given sufficient support. The reform is raised again in 1844, 1850 and 1853, before being finally passed in 1858. 
 - The Gustavsberg porcelain is founded.
 - Långholmens spinnhus is closed

Births
 3 June - Sophie Sager, feminist (died 1902) 
 5 January - Marcus Larson, painter  (died 1864) 
 5 January - Jeanette Möller, painter  (died 1872) 
 5 February – Ferdinand Fagerlin, painter (died 1907) 
 1 September - Sigrid Sparre, courtier (died 1910) 
 11 September - Peggy Hård, first female office clerk   (died 1894) 
 21 September – Mårten Eskil Winge, painter (died 1896) 
 19 October - Jeanette Granberg,  playwright, a feminist and a translator (died 1857)

Deaths

 3 February - Henric Schartau, pietist  (born 1757) 
 19 March - Brita Hagberg, soldier (born 1756)
 Charlotte Stierneld, courtier (born 1766)

References

 
Years of the 19th century in Sweden